Jean-Remy de Chestret (Liège 1739 - Paris 1809) was a Burgomaster of Liège in 1784 and 1789 and one of the chiefs of the Liège Revolution and later a member of the French Sénat conservateur.

He is referred to in the revolutionary song Valeureux Liégeois.

External links

People of the Liège Revolution
Members of the Sénat conservateur
1739 births
1809 deaths